San Pietro Vernotico is a railway station in the Italian town of San Pietro Vernotico, in the Province of Lecce, Apulia. The station lies on the Adriatic Railway (Ancona–Lecce) and was opened on 16 January 1866. The train services are operated by Trenitalia.

Train services
The station is served by the following service(s):

Regional services (Treno regionale) Bari - Monopoli - Brindisi - Lecce
Regional services (Treno regionale) Foggia - Bari - Monopoli - Brindisi - Lecce

See also
Railway stations in Italy
List of railway stations in Apulia
Rail transport in Italy
History of rail transport in Italy

This article is based upon a translation of the Italian language version as at January 2012.

Railway stations in Apulia
Railway stations opened in 1866
Buildings and structures in the Province of Lecce
1866 establishments in Italy
Railway stations in Italy opened in the 19th century